Frederick Barry (born July 31, 1948) is a former professional American football defensive back in the National Football League (NFL).  Barry played 9 games for the 1970 Pittsburgh Steelers

References

1948 births
Living people
American football defensive backs
Pittsburgh Steelers players
Boston University Terriers football players
Players of American football from Pennsylvania